The former Little Rock YMCA is a historic building at 524 Broadway Street in downtown Little Rock, Arkansas.  It is a large four-story brick building, with Mission Revival styling that includes a tower rising to an arcaded open top story.  It was built in 1928, and was one of the largest projects of Little Rock's leading architectural firm of the period, Mann and Stern.  The building has since been converted to commercial uses.

The building was listed on the National Register of Historic Places in 1979.

See also
National Register of Historic Places listings in Little Rock, Arkansas

References

Clubhouses on the National Register of Historic Places in Arkansas
Mission Revival architecture in Arkansas
Buildings and structures completed in 1928
Buildings and structures in Little Rock, Arkansas
National Register of Historic Places in Little Rock, Arkansas